Lewisville is a census-designated place (CDP) in Clark County, Washington, United States. The population was 1,722 at the 2010 census.

Geography
Lewisville is located in central Clark County at  (45.809255, -122.524912). It is bordered to the southeast by Venersborg, to the southwest by the city of Battle Ground, and for a small distance on the west by Cherry Grove.

Demographics
As of the census of 2000, there were 1,688 people, 552 households, and 476 families residing in the CDP. The population density was 276.9 people per square mile (106.8/km2). There were 563 housing units at an average density of 92.4/sq mi (35.6/km2). The racial makeup of the CDP was 95.97% White, 0.24% African American, 0.53% Native American, 0.41% Asian, 0.36% Pacific Islander, 1.54% from other races, and 0.95% from two or more races. Hispanic or Latino of any race were 1.78% of the population. 19.5% were of German, 13.9% English, 8.2% Norwegian, 7.5% Irish, 7.5% American, 6.8% Swedish and 5.9% Finnish ancestry according to Census 2000.

There were 552 households, out of which 39.9% had children under the age of 18 living with them, 79.2% were married couples living together, 4.9% had a female householder with no husband present, and 13.6% were non-families. 10.0% of all households were made up of individuals, and 3.8% had someone living alone who was 65 years of age or older. The average household size was 3.06 and the average family size was 3.27.

In the CDP, the age distribution of the population shows 29.6% under the age of 18, 7.0% from 18 to 24, 25.1% from 25 to 44, 29.6% from 45 to 64, and 8.7% who were 65 years of age or older. The median age was 39 years. For every 100 females, there were 102.2 males. For every 100 females age 18 and over, there were 98.8 males.

The median income for a household in the CDP was $65,221, and the median income for a family was $62,031. Males had a median income of $48,816 versus $38,068 for females. The per capita income for the CDP was $23,175. About 2.0% of families and 1.1% of the population were below the poverty line, including none of those under age 18 and 9.1% of those age 65 or over.

References

Census-designated places in Clark County, Washington
Census-designated places in Washington (state)